Robot Operating System (ROS or ros) is an open-source robotics middleware suite. Although ROS is not an operating system (OS) but a set of software frameworks for robot software development, it provides services designed for a heterogeneous computer cluster such as hardware abstraction, low-level device control, implementation of commonly used functionality, message-passing between processes, and package management. Running sets of ROS-based processes are represented in a graph architecture where processing takes place in nodes that may receive, post, and multiplex sensor data, control, state, planning, actuator, and other messages. Despite the importance of reactivity and low latency in robot control, ROS is not a real-time operating system (RTOS). However, it is possible to integrate ROS with real-time computing code. The lack of support for real-time systems has been addressed in the creation of ROS 2, a major revision of the ROS API which will take advantage of modern libraries and technologies for core ROS functions and add support for real-time code and embedded system hardware.

Software in the ROS Ecosystem can be separated into three groups:
 language-and platform-independent tools used for building and distributing ROS-based software;
 packages containing application-related code which uses one or more ROS client libraries.
Both the language-independent tools and the main client libraries (C++, Python, and Lisp) are released under the terms of the BSD license, and as such are open-source software and free for both commercial and research use. The majority of other packages are licensed under a variety of open-source licenses. These other packages implement commonly used functionality and applications such as hardware drivers, robot models, datatypes, planning, perception, simultaneous localization and mapping, simulation tools, and other algorithms.

The main ROS client libraries are geared toward a Unix-like system, mostly because of their dependence on large sets of open-source software dependencies. For these client libraries, Ubuntu Linux is listed as "Supported" while other variants such as Fedora Linux, macOS, and Microsoft Windows are designated "experimental" and are supported by the community. The native Java ROS client library, however, does not share these limitations and has enabled ROS-based software to be written for the Android OS.  has also enabled ROS to be integrated into an officially supported MATLAB toolbox which can be used on Linux, macOS, and Microsoft Windows. A JavaScript client library,  has also been developed which enables integration of software into a ROS system via any standards-compliant web browser.

History

Early days at Stanford (2007 and earlier) 
Sometime before 2007, the first pieces of what eventually would become ROS began coalescing at Stanford University. Eric Berger and Keenan Wyrobek, PhD students working in Kenneth Salisbury's robotics laboratory at Stanford, were leading the Personal Robotics Program. While working on robots to do manipulation tasks in human environments, the two students noticed that many of their colleagues were held back by the diverse nature of robotics: an excellent software developer might not have the hardware knowledge required, someone developing state of the art path planning might not know how to do the computer vision required. In an attempt to remedy this situation, the two students set out to make a baseline system that would provide a starting place for others in academia to build upon. In the words of Eric Berger, "something that didn’t suck, in all of those different dimensions".

In their first steps towards this unifying system, the two built the PR1 as a hardware prototype and began to work on software from it, borrowing the best practices from other early open-source robotic software frameworks, particularly switchyard, a system that Morgan Quigley, another Stanford PhD student, had been working on in support of the STanford Artificial Intelligence Robot (STAIR) by the Stanford Artificial Intelligence Laboratory. Early funding of US$50,000 was provided by Joanna Hoffman and Alain Rossmann, which supported the development of the PR1. While seeking funding for further development, Eric Berger and Keenan Wyrobek met Scott Hassan, the founder of Willow Garage, a technology incubator which was working on an autonomous SUV and a solar autonomous boat. Hassan shared Berger and Wyrobek's vision of a "Linux for robotics", and invited them to come and work at Willow Garage. Willow Garage was started in January 2007, and the first commit of ROS code was made to SourceForge on 7 November 2007.

Willow Garage (2007-2013) 
Willow Garage began developing the PR2 robot as a follow-up to the PR1, and ROS as the software to run it. Groups from more than twenty institutions made contributions to ROS, both the core software and the growing number of packages which worked with ROS to form a greater software ecosystem. That people outside of Willow were contributing to ROS (especially from Stanford's STAIR project) meant that ROS was a multi-robot platform from the start. While Willow Garage had originally had other projects in progress, they were scrapped in favor of the Personal Robotics Program: focused on producing the PR2 as a research platform for academia and ROS as the open-source robotics stack that would underlie both academic research and tech startups, much like the LAMP stack did for web-based startups.

In December 2008, Willow Garage met the first of their three internal milestones: continuous navigation for the PR2 over a period of two days and a distance of pi kilometers. Soon after, an early version of ROS (0.4 Mango Tango) was released, followed by the first RVIZ documentation and the first paper on ROS. In early summer, the second internal milestone: having the PR2 navigate the office, open doors, and plug itself it in, was reached. This was followed in August by the initiation of the ROS.org website. Early tutorials on ROS were posted in December, preparing for the release of ROS 1.0, in January 2010. This was Milestone 3: producing tons of documentation and tutorials for the enormous abilities that Willow Garage's engineers had developed over the preceding 3 years.

Following this, Willow Garage achieved one of its longest held goals: giving away 10 PR2 robots to worthy academic institutions. This had long been a goal of the founders, as they felt that the PR2 could kick-start robotics research around the world. They ended up awarding eleven PR2s to different institutions, including University of Freiburg (Germany), Robert Bosch GmbH, Georgia Institute of Technology, KU Leuven (Belgium), Massachusetts Institute of Technology (MIT), Stanford University, Technical University of Munich (Germany), University of California, Berkeley, University of Pennsylvania, University of Southern California (USC), and University of Tokyo (Japan). This, combined with Willow Garage's highly successful internship program (run from 2008 to 2010 by Melonee Wise), helped to spread the word about ROS throughout the robotics world. The first official ROS distribution release: ROS Box Turtle, was released on 2 March 2010, marking the first time that ROS was officially distributed with a set of versioned packages for public use. These developments led to the first drone running ROS, the first autonomous car running ROS, and the adaption of ROS for Lego Mindstorms. With the PR2 Beta program well underway, the PR2 robot was officially released for commercial purchase on 9 September 2010.

2011 was a banner year for ROS with the launch of ROS Answers, a Q/A forum for ROS users, on 15 February; the introduction of the highly successful TurtleBot robot kit on 18 April; and the total number of ROS repositories passing 100 on 5 May. Willow Garage began 2012 by creating the Open Source Robotics Foundation (OSRF) in April. The OSRF was immediately awarded a software contract by the Defense Advanced Research Projects Agency (DARPA). Later that year, the first ROSCon was held in St. Paul, Minnesota, the first book on ROS, ROS By Example, was published, and Baxter, the first commercial robot to run ROS, was announced by Rethink Robotics. Soon after passing its fifth anniversary in November, ROS began running on every continent on 3 December 2012.

In February 2013, the OSRF became the primary software maintainers for ROS, foreshadowing the announcement in August that Willow Garage would be absorbed by its founders, Suitable Technologies. At this point, ROS had released seven major versions (up to ROS Groovy), and had users all over the globe. This chapter of ROS development would be finalized when Clearpath Robotics took over support responsibilities for the PR2 in early 2014.

OSRF and Open Robotics (2013–present) 
In the years since OSRF took over primary development of ROS, a new version has been released every year, while interest in ROS continues to grow. ROSCons have occurred every year since 2012, co-located with either ICRA or IROS, two flagship robotics conferences. Meetups of ROS developers have been organized in a variety of countries, a number of ROS books have been published, and many educational programs initiated. On 1 September 2014, NASA announced the first robot to run ROS in space: Robotnaut 2, on the International Space Station. In 2017, the OSRF changed its name to Open Robotics. Tech giants Amazon and Microsoft began to take an interest in ROS during this time, with Microsoft porting core ROS to Windows in September 2018, followed by Amazon Web Services releasing RoboMaker in November 2018.

Perhaps the most important development of the OSRF/Open Robotics years thus far (not to discount the explosion of robot platforms which began to support ROS or the enormous improvements in each ROS version) was the proposal of ROS 2, a significant API change to ROS which is intended to support real-time programming, a wider variety of computing environments, and more modern technology. ROS 2 was announced at ROSCon 2014, the first commits to the  repository were made in February 2015, followed by alpha releases in August 2015. The first distribution release of ROS 2, Ardent Apalone, was released on 8 December 2017, ushering in a new era of next-generation ROS development.

Design

Philosophy 

ROS was designed to be open source, intending that users would be able to choose the configuration of tools and libraries which interacted with the core of ROS so that users could shift their software stacks to fit their robot and application area. As such, there is very little which is core to ROS, beyond the general structure within which programs must exist and communicate. In one sense, ROS is the underlying plumbing behind nodes and message passing. However, in reality, ROS is not only that plumbing, but a rich and mature set of tools, a wide-ranging set of robot-agnostic abilities provided by packages, and a greater ecosystem of additions to ROS.

Computation graph model 
ROS processes are represented as nodes in a graph structure, connected by edges called topics. ROS nodes can pass messages to one another through topics, make service calls to other nodes, provide a service for other nodes, or set or retrieve shared data from a communal database called the parameter server. A process called the ROS Master makes all of this possible by registering nodes to itself, setting up node-to-node communication for topics, and controlling parameter server updates. Messages and service calls do not pass through the master, rather the master sets up peer-to-peer communication between all node processes after they register themselves with the master. This decentralized architecture lends itself well to robots, which often consist of a subset of networked computer hardware, and may communicate with off-board computers for heavy computing or commands.

Nodes 
A node represents one process running the ROS graph. Every node has a name, which it registers with the ROS master before it can take any other actions. Multiple nodes with different names can exist under different namespaces, or a node can be defined as anonymous, in which case it will randomly generate an additional identifier to add to its given name. Nodes are at the center of ROS programming, as most ROS client code is in the form of a ROS node which takes actions based on information received from other nodes, sends information to other nodes, or sends and receives requests for actions to and from other nodes.

Topics 
Topics are named buses over which nodes send and receive messages. Topic names must be unique within their namespace as well. To send messages to a topic, a node must publish to said topic, while to receive messages it must subscribe. The publish/subscribe model is anonymous: no node knows which nodes are sending or receiving on a topic, only that it is sending/receiving on that topic. The types of messages passed on a topic vary widely and can be user-defined. The content of these messages can be sensor data, motor control commands, state information, actuator commands, or anything else.

Services 
A node may also advertise services. A service represents an action that a node can take which will have a single result. As such, services are often used for actions which have a defined start and end, such as capturing a one-frame image, rather than processing velocity commands to a wheel motor or odometer data from a wheel encoder. Nodes advertise services and call services from one another.

Parameter server 
The parameter server is a database shared between nodes which allows for communal access to static or semi-static information. Data which does not change frequently and as such will be infrequently accessed, such as the distance between two fixed points in the environment, or the weight of the robot, are good candidates for storage in the parameter server.

Tools
ROS's core functionality is augmented by a variety of tools which allow developers to visualize and record data, easily navigate the ROS package structures, and create scripts automating complex configuration and setup processes. The addition of these tools greatly increases the abilities of systems using ROS by simplifying and providing solutions to a number of common robotics development problems. These tools are provided in packages like any other algorithm, but rather than providing implementations of hardware drivers or algorithms for various robotic tasks, these packages provide task and robot-agnostic tools which come with the core of most modern ROS installations.

is a three-dimensional visualizer used to visualize robots, the environments they work in, and sensor data. It is a highly configurable tool, with many different types of visualizations and plugins.

is a command line tool used to record and playback ROS message data.  uses a file format called bags, which log ROS messages by listening to topics and recording messages as they come in. Playing messages back from a bag is largely the same as having the original nodes which produced the data in the ROS computation graph, making bags a useful tool for recording data to be used in later development.

catkin 
catkin is the ROS build system, having replaced  as of ROS Groovy. catkin is based on CMake, and is similarly cross-platform, open-source, and language-independent.

The  package provides a suite of tools which augment the functionality of the bash shell. The ROS versions of these tools allow users to use  package names in place of the file path where the package is located. The package also adds tab-completion to most ROS utilities, and includes rosed, which edits a given file with the chosen default text editor, as well , which runs executables in ROS packages.  supports the same functionalities for zsh and tcsh, to a lesser extent.

is a tool used to launch multiple ROS nodes both locally and remotely, as well as setting parameters on the ROS parameter server.  configuration files, which are written using XML can easily automate a complex startup and configuration process into a single command.  scripts can include other  scripts, launch nodes on specific machines, and even restart processes which die during execution.

Packages of note 
ROS contains many open-source implementations of common robotics functionality and algorithms. These open-source implementations are organized into packages. Some packages of note include:

Systems and tools 

  provides a standardized interface for interfacing with preemptable tasks.
  provides a way to run multiple algorithms in a single process.
  provides a JSON API to ROS functionalities for non-ROS programs.

Mapping and localization 

 slam toolbox provides full 2D SLAM and localization system.
  provides a wrapper for OpenSlam's Gmapping algorithm for simultaneous localization and mapping.
 cartographer provides real time 2D and 3D SLAM algorithms developed at Google.
  provides an implementation of adaptive Monte-Carlo localization.

Navigation 

 navigation provides the capability of navigating a mobile robot in a planar environment.

Perception 

  is a meta-package which provides packages for integrating ROS with OpenCV.

Coordinate frame representation 

  is the second generation of the  library, and provides the same abilities for ROS versions after Hydro.

Simulation 

  is a meta-package which provides packages for integrating ROS with the Gazebo simulator.
 stage provides an interface for the 2D Stage simulator.

Versions and releases
ROS releases may be incompatible with other releases and are often referred to by code name rather than version number. ROS currently releases a version every year in May, following the release of Ubuntu LTS versions. ROS 2 currently releases a new version every six months (in December and July). These releases are supported for a single year. There are currently two active major versions seeing releases: ROS 1 and ROS 2. Aside to this there is the ROS-Industrial or ROS-I derivate project since at least 2012.

ROS 1

ROS 2

ROS-Industrial 
ROS-Industrial is an open-source project (BSD (legacy)/Apache 2.0 (preferred) license) that extends the advanced abilities of ROS to manufacturing automation and robotics. In the industrial environment, there are two different approaches to programming a robot: either through an external proprietary controller, typically implemented using ROS, or via the respective native programming language of the robot. ROS can therefore be seen as the software-based approach to program industrial robots instead of the classic robot controller-based approach.

The ROS-Industrial repository includes interfaces for common industrial manipulators, grippers, sensors, and device networks. It also provides software libraries for automatic 2D/3D sensor calibration, process path/motion planning, applications like Scan-N-Plan, developer tools like the Qt Creator ROS Plugin, and training curriculum that is specific to the needs of manufacturers. ROS-I is supported by an international Consortium of industry and research members. The project began as a collaborative endeavor between Yaskawa Motoman Robotics, Southwest Research Institute, and Willow Garage to support the use of ROS for manufacturing automation, with the GitHub repository being founded in January 2012 by Shaun Edwards (SwRI). Currently, the Consortium is divided into three groups; the ROS-Industrial Consortium Americas (led by SwRI and located in San Antonio, Texas), the ROS-Industrial Consortium Europe (led by Fraunhofer IPA and located in Stuttgart, Germany) and the ROS-Industrial Consortium Asia Pacific (led by Advanced Remanufacturing and Technology Centre (ARTC) and Nanyang Technological University (NTU) and located in Singapore).

The Consortia supports the global ROS-Industrial community by conducting ROS-I training, providing technical support and setting the future roadmap for ROS-I, as well as conducting precompetitive joint industry projects to develop new ROS-I abilities.

ROS-compatible robots and hardware

Robots 

ABB, Adept, Fanuc, Motoman, and Universal Robots are supported by ROS-Industrial.
Baxter at Rethink Robotics, Inc.
CK-9: robotics development kit by Centauri Robotics, supports ROS.
HERB developed at Carnegie Mellon University in Intel's personal robotics program
 Husky A200: robot developed (and integrated into ROS) by Clearpath Robotics
 PR1: personal robot developed in Ken Salisbury's lab at Stanford
 PR2: personal robot being developed at Willow Garage
 Raven II Surgical Robotic Research Platform
 Shadow Robot Hand: a fully dexterous humanoid hand.
 STAIR I and II: robots developed in Andrew Ng's lab at Stanford
 SummitXL: mobile robot developed by Robotnik, an engineering company specialized in mobile robots, robotic arms, and industrial solutions with ROS architecture.
 Nao humanoid: University of Freiburg's Humanoid Robots Lab developed a ROS integration for the Nao humanoid based on an initial port by Brown University
 UBR1: developed by Unbounded Robotics, a spin-off of Willow Garage.
 ROSbot: autonomous robot platform by Husarion
Webots: robot simulator integrating a complete ROS programming interface.
 GoPiGo3: Raspberry Pi-based educational robot, supports ROS.

SBCs and hardware 

 BeagleBoard: the robotics lab of the Katholieke Universiteit Leuven, Belgium has ported ROS to the Beagleboard.
Sitara ARM Processors have support for the ROS package as part of the official Linux SDK.
 Raspberry Pi: image of Ubuntu Mate with ROS by Ubiquity Robotics; installation guide for Raspbian.

See also

 Open hardware
 Robotics middleware
 Open-source software
List of free and open-source software packages

References

Notes

 STAIR: The STanford Artificial Intelligence Robot project, Andrew Y. Ng, Stephen Gould, Morgan Quigley, Ashutosh Saxena, Eric Berger. Snowbird, 2008.

Related projects
 RT middleware – Robot middleware standard/implementations. RT-component is discussed/defined by the Object Management Group.

External links
 

2007 in robotics
2007 software
Computer vision software
Free software operating systems
Open-source robots
Robot operating systems
manipulation
Robotics suites
Software using the BSD license
Open Robotics